Captain Pantoja and the Special Services is a 1999 Peruvian-Spanish film directed by Francisco J. Lombardi. It is based on the eponymous comic novel by Mario Vargas Llosa. The film was chosen as Peru's official Best Foreign Language Film submission at the 72nd Academy Awards, but did not manage to receive a nomination.

Plot

The plot follows Captain Pantaleón Pantoja, a straightlaced army captain put in charge of creating a brothel for the army, in order to reduce the incidence of rape surrounding army bases and outposts.  The first half of the movie focuses on the humor of the situation, as Pantaleon runs the brothel like an efficient branch of the army. The second half is more dramatic as the captain is changed by running the army brothel and focuses on his relationship with the prostitute Olga "the Colombian".

Cast

Production 

Release 
The film premiered in Peru in late 1999. Its Spanish theatrical release was scheduled for 30 June 2000.

The North-American release features a runtime of 119 minutes.

See also 
 List of Peruvian films
 List of Spanish films of 2000

References

External links

1990s Spanish-language films
Films based on short fiction
Films directed by Francisco José Lombardi
Films about prostitution in Peru
1999 comedy-drama films
Peruvian comedy-drama films
Spanish comedy-drama films
Films based on works by Mario Vargas Llosa
1990s Peruvian films
1990s Spanish films
Tornasol Films films